The Highway Vagabond Tour is the seventh concert tour by American country music artist Miranda Lambert, in support of her sixth studio album The Weight of These Wings (2016). It began on January 26, 2017, in Evansville, Indiana and concluded on October 21, 2017, in White Springs, Florida. A rehearsal show occurred on January 24, 2017, two days before the tour started, at Joe's Bar in Chicago.

Background
Lambert first announced the tour in October 2016. Old Dominion and Aubrie Sellers served as opening acts.

The tour also marks Lambert's first solo tour dates in Europe (after previously playing shows in the UK as part of the C2C: Country to Country festival in 2016).

Opening Acts
Natalie Hemby (
Old Dominion 
Brandy Clark 
Aubrie Sellers 
The Cadillac Three 
Tucker Beathard 
Ward Thomas

Setlist

Intro (Up Above My Head by Sister Rosetta Tharpe)

"White Liar"
"Highway Vagabond"
"Pink Sunglasses"
"Heart Like Mine"
"Keeper of the Flame" 
"Vice"
"For the Birds"
"Over You"
"Willin'" 
"Fastest Girl in Town"
"The House That Built Me"
"All Kinds of Kinds"
"Mama's Broken Heart"
"Ugly Lights"
"Covered Wagon"
"We Should Be Friends"
"Automatic"
"Little Red Wagon"
"Gunpowder & Lead"
"Kerosene"
Encore
21. "Tin Man"
 
22. "Woke Up This Morning (With My Mind Stayed On Freedom)"

NOTE: For the European leg, the order was altered. "Keeper of the Flame", "For The Birds", "Willin'", "Covered Wagon" and "Woke Up This Morning" were replaced by "Baggage Claim", "Ain't Living Long Like This", "Crazy" and "I Still Haven't Found What I'm Looking For". Backing singer Gwen Sebastian was also given lead vocals on her new single "Cadillac".

Tour dates

Box office scores

Notes

References

2017 concert tours
Miranda Lambert concert tours